The Austrian National Road Race Championship is a cycling race where the Austrian cyclists decide who will become the champion for the year to come.

The winners of each event are awarded a symbolic cycling jersey which is red and white, just like the national flag. These colours can be worn by the rider at other road racing events in the country to show their status as national champion. The champion's stripes can be combined into a sponsored rider's team kit designed for this purpose.

Multiple winners

Men

Elite

U23

Women

Elite

Notes

References

National road cycling championships
Cycle races in Austria
Cycling
Recurring sporting events established in 1969